Microcoelia is a genus of orchids native to sub-Saharan Africa as well as to Madagascar and other islands of the Indian Ocean.

Microcoelia aphylla (Thouars) Summerh. - from Kenya and Uganda south to KwaZulu-Natal, plus Madagascar, Mauritius and Réunion 
Microcoelia aurantiaca (Schltr.) Summerh. - Madagascar
Microcoelia bispiculata L.Jonss.  - Madagascar
Microcoelia bulbocalcarata L.Jonss. - Príncipe, Cameroon, Gabon, Uganda, Rwanda 
Microcoelia caespitosa (Rolfe) Summerh. in J.Hutchinson & J.M.Dalziel - western and central Africa from Liberia to Zaïre and Uganda
Microcoelia corallina Summerh. - Tanzania, Mozambique, Malawi
Microcoelia cornuta (Ridl.) Carlsward - Madagascar, Comoros
Microcoelia decaryana L.Jonss. - Madagascar
Microcoelia dolichorhiza (Schltr.) Summerh. - Madagascar
Microcoelia elliotii (Finet) Summerh. - Madagascar
Microcoelia exilis Lindl. - from Kenya and Uganda south to KwaZulu-Natal, plus Madagascar
Microcoelia gilpinae (Rchb.f. & S.Moore) Summerh. - Madagascar
Microcoelia globulosa (Hochst.) L.Jonss.  - from Nigeria east to Eritrea, south to Angola and Zimbabwe
Microcoelia hirschbergii Summerh. - Zaïre, Zambia
Microcoelia jonssonii Szlach. & Olszewski - Central African Republic
Microcoelia koehleri (Schltr.) Summerh. - from Nigeria to Tanzania, south to Zimbabwe
Microcoelia konduensis (De Wild.) Summerh - western and central Africa
Microcoelia leptostele (Summerh.) L.Jonss. - Central African Republic, Zaïre
Microcoelia macrantha (H.Perrier) Summerh. - Madagascar
Microcoelia macrorhynchia (Schltr.) Summerh. in J.Hutchinson & J.M.Dalziel - central Africa
Microcoelia megalorrhiza (Rchb.f.) Summerh. - Kenya, Tanzania, Malawi
Microcoelia microglossa Summerh.  - central Africa
Microcoelia moreauae L.Jonss - Kenya, Tanzania, Zimbabwe
Microcoelia nyungwensis L.Jonss. - Rwanda
Microcoelia obovata Summerh. - from Kenya south to KwaZulu-Natal
Microcoelia ornithocephala P.J.Cribb - Malawi
Microcoelia perrieri (Finet) Summerh. - Madagascar
Microcoelia physophora (Rchb.f.) Summerh. - Kenya, Tanzania, Madagascar
Microcoelia sanfordii L.Jonss - Cameroon
Microcoelia smithii (Rolfe) Summerh. - Kenya, Tanzania, Malawi
Microcoelia stolzii (Schltr.) Summerh. - Kenya, Tanzania, Malawi, Mozambique, Zambia, Zimbabwe

References

Vandeae genera
Angraecinae
Epiphytic orchids